Implicational hierarchy, in linguistics, is a chain of implicational universals. A set of chained universals is schematically shown as in (1):

(1)	A < B < C < D

It can be reformulated in the following way: If a language has property D, then it also has properties A, B, and C; if a language has a property C, then it also has properties A and B, etc. In other words, the implicational hierarchy defines the possible combinations of properties A, B, C, and D as listed in matrix (2):

Implicational hierarchies are a useful tool in capturing linguistic generalizations 
pertaining the different components of the language. They are found in all subfields of grammar.

Phonology
(3) is an example of an implicational hierarchy concerning the distribution of nasal phonemes across languages, which concerns dental/alveolar, bilabial, and palatal voiced nasals, 
respectively: 
 
(3)       <       <  

This hierarchy defines the following possible combinations of dental/alveolar, bilabial, and palatal voiced nasals in 
the phoneme inventory of a language:

(4) 

Morphology
Number marking provides an example of implicational hierarchies in morphology.

(5) Number: singular < plural < dual < trial / paucal

On the one hand, the hierarchy implies that no language distinguishes a trial unless having a dual, and no language has dual without a plural. On the other hand, the hierarchy provides implications for the morphological marking: if the plural is coded with a certain number of morphemes, then the dual is coded with at least as many morphemes.

Syntax
Implicational hierarchies also play a role in syntactic phenomena. For instance, in some languages (e.g. Tangut) the transitive verb agrees not with a subject, or the object, but with the syntactic argument which is higher on the person hierarchy.

(5) Person: first < second < third
 
See also: animacy.

Bibliography
 Comrie, B. (1989). Language universals and linguistic typology: Syntax and morphology. Oxford: Blackwell, 2nd edn.
 Croft, W. (1990). Typology and universals. Cambridge: Cambridge UP.
 Whaley, L.J. (1997). Introduction to typology: The unity and diversity of language. Newbury Park: Sage.

Linguistic typology